General Sir Thomas Spencer Wilson, 6th Baronet (25 January 1727 – 29 August 1798) was an officer of the British Army and politician who sat in the House of Commons from 1774 to 1780.

The son of Sir Thomas Wilson, 4th Baronet, he was educated at Charterhouse School. He succeeded his brother in the baronetcy in 1760. By his wife, Jane Weller, he had one son and three daughters. One daughter married Charles Perceval, 2nd Baron Arden and another married Spencer Perceval, the future prime minister.

He joined the British Army as an ensign in the 8th Regiment of Foot in 1744. He reached the rank of captain in that regiment, and on 14 April 1762, became a captain-lieutenant in the 2nd Regiment of Foot Guards. He progressed through the ranks to Major-General in 1777. He was made colonel of the 50th Regiment of Foot from 1777 until his death, promoted to lieutenant-general in 1782 and full general in 1796. He took part in the war in Flanders, the rebellion in Scotland, the war in Germany, where he was aide-de-camp to Lord Waldegrave at the battle of Minden, and in three expeditions on the coast of France.

He was MP for Sussex from 1774 to 1780.

References

 John Brooke, WILSON, Sir Thomas Spencer, 6th Bt. (1727-98), of Uckfield, Suss. in The History of Parliament: the House of Commons 1754-1790 (1964).

|-
 

1727 births
1798 deaths
People educated at Charterhouse School
Baronets in the Baronetage of England
British Army generals
King's Regiment (Liverpool) officers
Queen's Own Royal West Kent Regiment officers
British MPs 1774–1780
Members of the Parliament of Great Britain for English constituencies
Coldstream Guards officers